List of conservation organizations may refer to: 

List of nature conservation organizations
List of cultural conservation and restoration organizations